Frederick “Fritz” Scardina was a U.S. soccer player who earned one cap with the U.S. national team in a 2-2 tie with Canada on August 29, 1972 in a 1974 World Cup qualification match in Baltimore.

He was inducted into the Maryland Soccer Hall of Fame in 2000.

References

United States men's international soccer players
Living people
American soccer players
Soccer players from Maryland
Association footballers not categorized by position
Year of birth missing (living people)